Methylenedioxymethylphentermine
Military Decision Making Process
 Microsoft minidump file, similar in principle to a core dump
MDMP (American Band)